Aero Comercial Oriente Norte Ltda., doing business as Aerocon, was a Bolivian airline. Its national office was in Hangar 93 in El Trompillo Airport in Santa Cruz de la Sierra.

It started its operations in 2005. In 2006, the airline transferred its operational base to Trinidad. It was also called the Airline of Beni Department. It operated from Trinidad to Cobija, Cochabamba, Guayaramerín, La Paz, Riberalta, Santa Cruz, Yacuiba, Sucre, and Tarija but in 2015 it stopped operating due to finance problems and resulting severe security issues.

Destinations
In January 2013, Aerocon offered scheduled flights to the following destinations:

 Bolivia
Cobija - Captain Aníbal Arab Airport
Cochabamba - Jorge Wilstermann International Airport
Guayaramerín - Guayaramerín Airport
La Paz - El Alto International Airport
Oruro - Juan Mendoza Airport
Potosí - Captain Nicolas Rojas Airport
Puerto Suarez - Puerto Suárez International Airport
Riberalta - Riberalta Airport
Rurrenabaque - Rurrenabaque Airport
Santa Cruz - El Trompillo Airport
Sucre - Juana Azurduy de Padilla International Airport
Tarija - Capitán Oriel Lea Plaza Airport
Trinidad - Teniente Jorge Henrich Arauz Airport
Yacuiba - Yacuiba Airport

Fleet

Accidents and incidents
On 7 September 2011, Aerocon Flight 238 from El Trompillo Airport, Santa Cruz de la Sierra to Teniente Jorge Henrich Arauz Airport, Trinidad, Bolivia crashed on approach to Trinidad. The flight was operated by a Fairchild SA227-BC Metro III. There were nine people on board, of whom eight were killed.
On 3 November 2013, an Aerocon airliner crashed when it was trying to land at the airport in Riberalta that killed 8 people.

External links

 
"DGAC descarta que accidente de Aerocon fue falla de torre." Página Siete. 14 September 2011.

References

Defunct airlines of Bolivia
Airlines established in 2005
Airlines disestablished in 2015
Bolivian companies established in 2005
2015 disestablishments in Bolivia